David Zucker (born November 11, 1987) is a Czech professional ice hockey player. He played with HC Karlovy Vary in the Czech Extraliga during the 2010–11 Czech Extraliga season.

References

External links 

1987 births
Czech ice hockey left wingers
HC Karlovy Vary players
Living people
People from Sokolov
Sportspeople from the Karlovy Vary Region
Sportovní Klub Kadaň players
Piráti Chomutov players
EV Landshut players
Ravensburg Towerstars players
Fischtown Pinguins players
MHC Martin players
HC Most players
HC Baník Sokolov players
Czech expatriate ice hockey players in Germany
Czech expatriate ice hockey players in Slovakia
Naturalized citizens of Germany